The pudus (Mapudungun püdü or püdu) are two species of South American deer from the genus Pudu, and are the world's smallest deer. The chevrotains (mouse-deer; Tragulidae) are smaller, but they are not true deer. The name is a loanword from Mapudungun, the language of the indigenous Mapuche people of central Chile and south-western Argentina. The two species of pudus are the northern pudu (Pudu mephistophiles) from Venezuela, Colombia, Ecuador, and Peru, and the southern pudu (Pudu puda; sometimes incorrectly modified to Pudu pudu) from southern Chile and south-western Argentina. The southern pudu is classified as near threatened, while the northern pudu is classified as Data Deficient in the IUCN Red List.

Taxonomy
The genus Pudu was first erected by English naturalist John Edward Gray in 1850. Pudua was a Latinized version of the name proposed by Alfred Henry Garrod in 1877, but was ruled invalid. Pudus are classified in the New World deer subfamily Capreolinae within the deer family Cervidae. The term "pudú" itself is derived from the language of the Mapuche people of the Los Lagos Region of south-central Chile. Because they live on the slopes of the Andes Mountain Range, they are also known as the "Chilean mountain goat".

Two similar species of pudús are recognised:

Description
The pudus are the world's smallest deer, with the southern pudu being slightly larger than the northern pudu. It has a stocky frame supported by short and slender legs. Sexual dimorphism in the species includes an absence of antlers in females. Males have short, spiked antlers that are not forked, as seen in most species of deer. Also on the head are large preorbital glands. Coat coloration varies with season, sex, and individual genes. The fur is long and stiff, typically pressed close to the body, with a reddish-brown to dark-brown hue. The neck and shoulders of an aged pudu turn a dark gray-brown in the winter.

Habitat and distribution

The pudú inhabits temperate rainforests in South America, where the dense underbrush and bamboo thickets offer protection from predators. Southern Chile, south-west Argentina, Chiloé Island, and northwest South America are home to the deer.

The climate of the pudú's habitat is composed of two main seasons: a damp, moderate winter and an arid summer.

Behavior

Social
The pudú is a solitary animal whose behavior in the wild is largely unknown because of its secretive nature. Pudús are crepuscular, most active in the morning, late afternoon, and evening. Each pudú has its own home range, or territory. A single animal's territory is marked with sizable dung piles found on paths and near eating and resting areas. Large facial glands for scent communication allow correspondence with other pudú deer. Pudús do not interact socially, other than to mate. An easily frightened animal, the deer barks when in fear. Its fur bristles and the pudú shivers when angered.

Predators of the pudús include the horned owl, Andean fox, Magellan fox, cougar, and other small cats. The pudú is a wary animal that moves slowly and stops often, smelling the air for scents of predators. Being a proficient climber, jumper, and sprinter, the deer flees in a zigzag path when being pursued. The lifespan of the pudús ranges from 8 to 10 years in the wild. The longest recorded lifespan is 15 years and 9 months. However, such longevity is rare and most pudús die at a much younger age, from a wide range of causes. Maternal neglect of newborns, as well as a wide range of diseases, can decrease the population. A popular rumor is that if alarmed to a high degree, pudús die from fear-induced cardiac complications.

Diet
The pudús are herbivorous, consuming vines, leaves from low trees, shrubs, succulent sprouts, herbs, ferns, blossoms, buds, tree bark, and fallen fruit. They can survive without drinking water for long periods due to the high water content of the succulent foliage in their diets.

Pudús have various methods of obtaining the foliage they need. Their small stature and cautious nature create obstacles in attaining food. They stop often while searching for food to stand on their hind legs and smell the wind, detecting food scents. Females and fawns peel bark from saplings using their teeth, but mature males may use their spikelike antlers. The deer may use their front legs to press down on saplings until they snap or become low enough to the ground so they can reach the leaves. Forced to stand on their hind legs due to their small size, the deer climb branches and tree stumps to reach higher foliage. They bend bamboo shoots horizontally in order to walk on them and eat from higher branches.

Reproduction

Pudús are solitary and only come together for rut. Mating season is in the Southern Hemisphere autumn, from April to May. Pudú DNA is arranged into 70 chromosomes. To mate, the pudú male rests his chin on the female's back, then sniffs her rear before mounting her from behind, holding her with his fore legs. The gestation period ranges from 202 to 223 days (around 7 months) with the average being 210 days. A single offspring or sometimes twins are born in austral spring, from November to January. Newborns weigh  with the average birth weight being . Females and males weigh the same at birth. Fawns have reddish-brown fur and southern pudú fawns have white spots running the length of their backs. Young are weaned after 2 months. Females mature sexually in 6 months, while males mature in 8–12 months. Fawns are fully grown in 3 months, but may stay with their mothers for 8 to 12 months.

Status and conservation

The southern pudu is currently listed as near threatened on the IUCN Red List, mainly because of overhunting and habitat loss, while the northern pudu is currently classified as being 'Data deficient'. Pudu puda is listed in CITES Appendix I, and Pudu mephistophiles is listed in CITES Appendix II. The southern species is more easily maintained in captivity than the northern, though small populations of the northern formerly existed in zoos. , more than 100 southern pudús are kept at Species360-registered institutions with the vast majority in European and US zoos. Pudús are difficult to transport because they are easily overheated and stressed. Pudús are protected in various national parks; parks require resources to enforce protection of the deer.

Efforts to preserve the pudú species are being taken in order to prevent extinction. An international captive-breeding program for the southern pudú led by Concepcion University in Chile has been started. Some deer have been bred in captivity and reintroduced into Nahuel Huapi National Park in Argentina. Reintroduction efforts include the use of radio collars for tracking. The Convention on International Trade in Endangered Species has banned the international trading of pudús. The Wildlife Conservation Society protects their natural habitat and works to recreate it for pudús in captivity. Despite efforts made by the World Wildlife Fund, the size of the pudú population remains unknown. Threats to the pudús remain despite various conservation efforts.

Threats
Pudús are threatened due to the destruction of their rainforest habitat. The land is cleared for human development, cattle ranching, agriculture, logging, and exotic tree plantations.
Habitat fragmentation and road accidents cause pudú deaths. They are taken from the wild as pets, as well as exported illegally.
They are overhunted and killed for food by specially trained hunting dogs.
The recently introduced red deer compete with pudús for food. Domestic dogs prey upon pudús and transfer parasites through contact. Pudús are very susceptible to diseases such as bladder worms, lungworms, roundworms, and heartworms.

References

Capreolinae
Mammals of Argentina
Mammals of Chile
Mammals of Colombia
Mammals of Ecuador
Mammals of Peru
Mammals of Venezuela
Taxa named by John Edward Gray
Mammal genera